Pablo Dominic Brägger (born November 27, 1992) is a Swiss male artistic gymnast and a member of the national team. He participated at the 2015 World Artistic Gymnastics Championships in Glasgow, and qualified for the 2016 Summer Olympics.

He won the gold medal on the high bar at the 2017 European Artistic Gymnastics Championships in Cluj.

References

External links

 

1992 births
Living people
Swiss male artistic gymnasts
Place of birth missing (living people)
Gymnasts at the 2016 Summer Olympics
Olympic gymnasts of Switzerland
European champions in gymnastics
Gymnasts at the 2020 Summer Olympics